Screen Novelties is an American animation studio, specializing in stop motion animation. It was founded by Mark Caballero, Seamus Walsh, and Chris Finnegan.

Overview 
Their work fuses classic cartoon sensibilities with mixed-media elements such as puppetry and miniature model photography. They were among the first stop motion artists to adopt an entirely digital capture system and workflow, beginning in 1999 with the pilot films that would eventually become Robot Chicken. Screen Novelties was integral in the launch of both Robot Chicken and Moral Orel for Cartoon Network's Adult Swim programming block. They also animated the stop motion SpongeBob SquarePants episodes, It's a Spongebob Christmas! and The Legend of Boo-Kini Bottom.

Notable past work includes:
 Creating a stop motion animation version of the Flintstones for a dream sequence in The Flintstones: On the Rocks.
 Working with Ray Harryhausen, helping him complete his film The Story of The Tortoise & the Hare.
 Contributing whimsical puppet and special effects sequences for Cartoon Network shows Chowder and The Marvelous Misadventures of Flapjack.
 Performing the restoration of the original Rudolph & Santa Puppets from the 1964 classic Rudolph the Red-Nosed Reindeer 

Their offbeat short films enjoy a small cult following, especially "Mysterious Mose" which was made in their garage in 1997-98, using a hand-wound Bolex camera and an old 78rpm record as the soundtrack. The film mixes rod puppetry, stop motion animation, and silhouette animation.

Filmography
 Old Man & the Goblins
 The Boy with the Flip-top Head
 Graveyard Jamboree with Mysterious Mose
 The Story of The Tortoise & the Hare
 Monster Safari
 Zombie Brothers
 Monster High: Gaga for Ghouls

Television/film credits

Video game credits

Commercials

Nike
Hallmark Cards
Mississippi State Department of Health
Rotofugi
CareerBuilder
All
Corn Pops
McDonald's
Ray-Ban
Jim Henson's Creature Shop Challenge
Google
Honda
Target Corporation
GMC
Hewlett-Packard

Awards and nominations
Won 30th Annual Annie Award in the category Best Short Film for The Story of the Tortoise & The Hare.

Nominated for the 34th Annual Annie Award in the category Best Animated Television Commercial.

References

External links
 Official website

American animation studios
Mass media companies established in 2000